Junior Udeme Pius  (born 20 December 1995) is a Nigerian professional footballer who plays for Romanian Liga I club FC Botoșani as a central defender.

Club career
Born in Eman, Akwa Ibom, Pius finished his development in Portugal with FC Porto. On 1 September 2014, he was loaned to C.D. Aves to kickstart his senior career, making his Segunda Liga debut on 5 October in a 0–0 away draw against C.D. Santa Clara where he was sent off for two late bookable offences.

Released by Porto at the end of the season, Pius took his game to the Portuguese third division, representing in quick succession F.C. Cesarense and A.D. Sanjoanense. In the summer of 2017 he moved straight to the Primeira Liga, signing a three-year contract with C.D. Tondela. He played his first game in the latter competition on 16 September, when he came on as a 31st-minute substitute in a 2–0 away loss to Sporting CP.

Honours
Paços de Ferreira
LigaPro: 2018–19

Antwerp
Belgian Cup: 2019–20

References

External links

1995 births
Living people
Sportspeople from Akwa Ibom State
Nigerian footballers
Association football defenders
Primeira Liga players
Liga Portugal 2 players
Campeonato de Portugal (league) players
FC Porto players
C.D. Aves players
A.D. Sanjoanense players
C.D. Tondela players
F.C. Paços de Ferreira players
Belgian Pro League players
Royal Antwerp F.C. players
Sint-Truidense V.V. players
Liga I players
FC Botoșani players
Nigerian expatriate footballers
Expatriate footballers in Portugal
Expatriate footballers in Belgium
Expatriate footballers in Romania
Nigerian expatriate sportspeople in Portugal
Nigerian expatriate sportspeople in Belgium
Nigerian expatriate sportspeople in Romania